The 2009–10 Wyoming Cowboys basketball team represented the University of Wyoming during the 2009–2010 NCAA Division I men's basketball season. The Cowboys were coached by Heath Schroyer who was in his 3rd season and played their home games at the Arena-Auditorium in Laramie, Wyoming. The Cowboys are a member of the Mountain West Conference. They finished the season 10–21, 3–13 in Mountain West play and lost in the first round of the 2010 Mountain West Conference men's basketball tournament to Air Force.

Offseason
April 15: Cowboy basketball head coach Heath Schroyer announced the signing of Desmar Jackson, a high school standout from Warren, Ohio, to a National Letter of Intent to attend the University of Wyoming. Jackson will enroll at Wyoming for the fall semester of 2009.
April 27: Akron, Ohio native Daylen Harrison signed a National Letter of Intent to play basketball for the Cowboys on Sunday. Harrison will enroll at Wyoming for the fall semester of 2009, following his senior year of high school.
May 6:University of Wyoming Athletics Director Tom Burman announced that head basketball coach Heath Schroyer's contract has been extended for two years, through April 30, 2014. Schroyer's base salary was also increased from $150,000 to $160,000. His original contract was a five-year deal that was due to end after the 2011-12 season.
May 6: The NCAA released the Academic Progress Rate (APR) Public Report for the 2007-08 academic year and the University of Wyoming men's basketball team received its highest annual score in the history of the APR. The team achieved an annual score of 935 during the 2007-08 academic year, the Cowboys improved their multiyear score to 884. Due to the Cowboys' academic improvement and a favorable comparison based on other academic and institutional factors, the Cowboys will be allotted 13 scholarships for the 2009-10 season. That is the maximum number of scholarships allowed by the NCAA for men's basketball programs.
May 18: University of Wyoming redshirt sophomore point guard JayDee Luster was announced as a team captain for the 2009-10 Cowboy basketball team.

Roster

Statistics

Schedule and results

|-
!colspan=9 style=| Exhibition

|-
!colspan=9 style=| Regular Season

|-

|-
!colspan=10 style=| Mountain West tournament

References

Wyoming Cowboys basketball seasons
Wyoming
Wyoming Cowboys bask
Wyoming Cowboys bask